Fabogethes is a genus of pollen beetles in the family Nitidulidae. There are at least two described species in Fabogethes.

Species
These two species belong to the genus Fabogethes:
 Fabogethes nigrescens (Stephens, 1830) (black pollen beetle)
 Fabogethes opacus (Rosenhauer, 1856)

References

Further reading

 
 
 

Nitidulidae
Articles created by Qbugbot